The Integrated Terrorism Assessment Centre (ITAC) is an independent federal organization tasked with assessing threats of terrorism to Canada and Canadian interests abroad. It is the only federal organization with the specific responsibility of analyzing terrorism threats related to Canada.

ITAC is responsible for assessing and recommending the National Terrorism Threat Level, used by the Canadian government and law enforcement agencies to "mitigate the potential effects of terrorism incidents in Canada and abroad." Administratively, ITAC functions as a component of Canadian Security Intelligence Service (CSIS) and is subject to the CSIS Act. However, operationally, it is independent of CSIS and is accountable to the National Security Advisor, rather than the Director of CSIS.

Co-located with CSIS in Ottawa, the ITAC is a cooperative initiative that facilitates intelligence information sharing and analysis within the Canadian intelligence community and to first responders, such as law enforcement.

History
In 2003, the government of Paul Martin established the Integrated Threat Assessment Centre following the environment that followed the September 11 attacks in the US as well as the 2002–2004 SARS outbreak, among other things. The ITAC officially became operational the following year, on 15 October 2004.

In 2008, the government of Stephen Harper changed the group's mandate to prioritize terrorist threats to Canadians and Canadian interests. The ITAC was subsequently renamed the Integrated Terrorism Assessment Centre in June 2011, emphasizing its focus on terrorism.

Partners
Co-located with CSIS in Ottawa, the ITAC is a cooperative initiative that facilitates intelligence information sharing and analysis within the Canadian intelligence community and to first responders, such as law enforcement.

Domestic partners include:
 Canadian Armed Forces
Canada Border Services Agency
 Canada Revenue Agency
 Canadian Security Intelligence Service
 Communications Security Establishment
 Correctional Service of Canada
 Department of National Defence
 Financial Transactions and Reports Analysis Centre of Canada
 Global Affairs Canada
 Ontario Provincial Police
 Privy Council Office
 Public Safety Canada
 Royal Canadian Mounted Police
 Sûreté du Québec
Transport Canada
International partners include:

 Australia National Threat Assessment Centre
 New Zealand Combined Threat Assessment Group
 U.S. National Counterterrorism Center
 U.K. Joint Terrorism Analysis Centre

National Terrorism Threat Level 
The National Terrorism Threat Level (NTTL) is a tool used by Canadian government officials, including law enforcement agencies, to identify risks and vulnerabilities from threats of terrorism in Canada. It represents the probability of a violent act of terrorism occurring in Canada, based on information and intelligence. Assessment and recommendation of the NTTL is the responsibility of the Integrated Terrorism Assessment Centre.

The NTTL was formalized in early October 2014 when the threat level was first raised in Canada, anticipating incidents like the two that occurred later that month—the Saint-Jean-sur-Richelieu ramming attack and the shootings at Parliament Hill. In addition to mitigating the potential effects of terrorism incidents in Canada and abroad, its key benefit is that it helps to ensure a common understanding of the general terrorist threat to Canada.

, Canada's current level is "Medium," which means that a "violent act of terrorism could occur;" it has been at this level since October 2014. More specifically, this means that "extremist groups and individuals located in Canada and abroad, have both the intent AND capability to carry out an act of terrorism in Canada."

Threat Level assessments are conducted every four months at a minimum, or more frequently if needed.

See also

 Terrorism in Canada
 Terror alert system

References

External links
 Integrated Terrorism Assessment Centre home page
 Backgrounder

Federal departments and agencies of Canada
Canadian intelligence agencies
Government of Canada
Canadian Security Intelligence Service
2003 establishments in Canada
Public Safety Canada
Canada's National Terrorism Threat Level
National security in Canada